Alfonso Blanco Antúnez (born 31 July 1987) is a Mexican professional footballer who plays as a goalkeeper for Liga MX club León.

Club career
Blanco began in Pachuca's youth division teams and then was transferred on loan for Indios de Ciudad Juárez in the 2007 Season after having a good performance during the U-20 World Cup in Canada in 2006.

Blanco arrived to Indios as one of the main bookings for the season but after 4 games and receiving 10 goals he was relegated to the bench for the rest of the season. Indios managed to qualify for the Liguilla in Apertura 2007 and due to an injury from the goalie Joel Barba, Blanco returned to the first team and helped the team get to the finals.

Though he did not make his debut in the Primera División with Pachuca, there were already offers for Blanco from European clubs from Spain, Greece and Holland but in the end, he settled with Cruz Azul. After Óscar Pérez's controversial signing with Tigres UANL, Cruz Azul brought Blanco, possibly, to be a substitute of Yosgart Gutiérrez, the Goalkeeper who took Perez's spot. He played the rest of Clausura 2009 as the Cruz Azul starter goalkeeper but the team finished in the last place of the table. On June 19, 2009, he was signed by Deportivo Irapuato. Later he joined Club León.

Before starting Clausura 2012, it was announced he would play for his original club, Pachuca.

Honours
Pachuca
CONCACAF Champions League: 2016–17

León
Liga MX: Guardianes 2020

Individual
CONCACAF Champions League Golden Glove: 2016–17

References

1987 births
Living people
Footballers from Veracruz
Association football goalkeepers
Mexican footballers
Mexico under-20 international footballers
Indios de Ciudad Juárez footballers
C.F. Pachuca players
Cruz Azul footballers
Irapuato F.C. footballers
Club América footballers
Club Necaxa footballers
Club León footballers
Atlético San Luis footballers
Liga MX players